The Eidshaugane Peaks are a group of peaks  north of Eidsgavlen Cliff in the Humboldt Mountains of Queen Maud Land. They were discovered and photographed by the Third German Antarctic Expedition, 1938–39. They were mapped from air photos and surveys by the Sixth Norwegian Antarctic Expedition, 1956–60, and named Eidshaugane (the isthmus hills).

References 

Mountains of Queen Maud Land
Humboldt Mountains (Antarctica)